Louisa-Christin Lippmann (born 23 September 1994) is a German female volleyball player. She plays as an outside hitter or opposite and has over 100 appearances for the Germany women's national volleyball team. At club level she currently plays for Lokomotiv Kaliningrad. Lippmann played in many international competitions (FIVB World Championships, FIVB World Grand Prix, FIVB Nations League, European Championships, European Leagues, European Games) and won the German league, cup and supercup with the clubs she played for.

Career

Club
Her first sport was athletics before she tried volleyball at TG Herford. She soon moved to SV Bielefeld and played in the youth teams until 2010 when she moved to USC Münster, where she progressed from the second league to the Bundesliga. In 2014 she went to Dresdner SC, winning the Bundesliga twice and the German Cup once. In 2016, she moved to Schweriner SC with whom she won another two Bundesliga titles, one German Super Cup and a German Cup runners-up place.

While playing for Dresdner SC and Schweriner SC, she also competed in European competitions (twice with each team). She reached the playoff stage of both 2014–15 CEV Women's Champions League and 2015–16 CEV Women's Champions League with Dresden and helped Schwerin reach two semifinals, in the 2016–17 CEV Women's Challenge Cup and in the 2017–18 Women's CEV Cup.

She was the Bundesliga most valuable player twice (2016–17 and 2017–18) and was named the female German volleyball player of the year in 2017.

Ahead of the 2018–19 season, she signed with Italian club Il Bisonte Firenze.

National team
Lippmann has been part of the Germany women's national volleyball team since 2013, but a shoulder injury prevented her from making her debut for a year, when she finally played in the 2014 Montreux Volley Masters, Germany won the tournament. Later that year, she helped Germany finish second at the 2014 Women's European Volleyball League and ninth place at the 2014 FIVB Volleyball Women's World Championship. She was part of the German runners-up team at the 2017 Montreux Volley Masters, and has played in European Championships, European League, European Games, FIVB World Grand Prix and FIVB Nations League.

Clubs
  TG Herford
  Post Telekom Bielefeld ( –2010)
  USC Münster (2010–2014)
  Dresdner SC (2014–2016)
  SSC Palmberg Schwerin (2016–2018)
  Il Bisonte Firenze (2018–2019)
  Shanghai women's volleyball team (2019–2020)
  SSC Palmberg Schwerin (2019–2020)
  Shanghai women's volleyball team (2020–2021)
  Lokomotiv Kaliningrad (2021)

Awards

Individual
 2016–17 German League Most Valuable Player
 2017 German Volleyball Player of the Year
 2017–18 German League Most Valuable Player
 2020 CEV Tokyo qualification "Opposite Spiker"

National team

Senior
 2014 Montreux Volley Masters —  Gold medal
 2014 Women's European Volleyball League —  Silver medal
 2017 Montreux Volley Masters —  Silver medal

National championships
 2014–15 German Championship —  Gold medal (with Dresdner SC)
 2015–16 German Cup —  Gold medal (with Dresdner SC)
 2015–16 German Championship —  Gold medal (with Dresdner SC)
 2016–17 German Cup —  Silver medal (with Schweriner SC)
 2016–17 German Championship —  Gold medal (with Schweriner SC)
 2017 German Super Cup —  Gold medal (with Schweriner SC)
 2017–18 German Championship —  Gold medal (with Schweriner SC)
 2020–21 Russian Championship –  Gold medal (with Lokomotiv Kaliningrad)

References

External links
 Profile at legavolleyfemminile.it 

1994 births
Living people
German women's volleyball players
European Games competitors for Germany
Volleyball players at the 2015 European Games
People from Herford
Sportspeople from Detmold (region)
20th-century German women
21st-century German women